Emma Manzelmann (born 30 November 2001) is an Australian professional rugby league footballer who currently plays for the Newcastle Knights in the NRL Women's Premiership.

Background
Manzelmann was born in Mackay, Queensland.

Playing career

Early years
In May 2019, Manzelmann represented Mackay in the Northern Region Women's Championship and was named in the North Queensland Women's Emerging Marlins squad. In June 2019, she represented the Queensland women's under-18s team. In 2020, she played for the Mackay Magpies in the Mackay women's competition, before joining the North Queensland Gold Stars in the BHP Premiership. In September 2021, she was named the North Queensland Gold Stars Player of the Year. In December 2021, she signed with the Newcastle Knights to be a part of their inaugural NRLW squad.

2022
In round 1 of the delayed 2021 NRL Women's season, Manzelmann made her NRLW debut for the Knights against the Parramatta Eels.

On 2 October, Manzelmann played in the Knights' 2022 NRLW Grand Final win over the Parramatta Eels.

References

External links
Newcastle Knights profile

2001 births
Australian female rugby league players
Newcastle Knights (NRLW) players
Rugby league hookers
Living people